Khariya is a census town in Sonbhadra district in the Indian state of Uttar Pradesh.

Demographics
 India census, Khariya had a population of 9836. Males constitute 55% of the population and females 45%. Khariya has an average literacy rate of 72%, higher than the national average of 59.5%: male literacy is 79%, and female literacy is 63%. In Khariya, 15% of the population is under 6 years of age.

References

Cities and towns in Sonbhadra district